The 1953–54 Liga Bet season saw Hapoel Hadera (champions of the North Division) and Beitar Jerusalem (champions of the South Division) promoted to Liga Alef.

Degel Yehuda Haifa and Hapoel Dror Haifa were both relegated from the North Division. Hapoel Herzliya and Hapoel Mishmar HaShiv'a were both relegated from the South Division, whilst Maccabi Rishon LeZion collapsed and withdrew from the league.

North Division

South Division

References
1953-54 Bnei Yehuda 
Previous seasons The Israel Football Association 

Liga Bet seasons
Israel
2